INS Kavaratti (P31) is an anti-submarine warfare corvette of the Indian Navy built under Project 28. It is the last of four Kamorta-class corvettes. The ship was built by the Garden Reach Shipbuilders and Engineers, Kolkata, and launched on 19 May 2015. Kavaratti represents a leap forward in the Navy's attempts at indigenisation with as much as 90% of its content drawn from India itself. It was commissioned into the Navy on 22 October 2020 in Visakhapatnam.

History 
The keel of Kavaratti was laid on 20 January 2012 and it was launched in Kolkata on 19 May 2015. The ship cost an estimated 1,700 crores. The ship takes its name from the Kavaratti, capital of the Union Territory of Lakshadweep in India.

Design 
Kavaratti is India's one of the 
first ship to have a superstructure of carbon fibre composite material that has been integrated with its main hull resulting in lower top weight and maintenance costs and improved stealth features. The ship is 109 metres long and 12.8 metres broad and is highly maneuverable with a top speed of 25 knots. It has a displacement of 3,300 tonnes and a range of about 3,450 nautical miles at 18 knots. It is powered by 4 diesel engines that generate a combined power of 3000 kW and propelled by a main unit of four 3,888 kW diesel engines at 1,050 rpm.

Kavaratti is to be armed with a range of indigenously developed cutting-edge weapons and sensors, including "a medium-range gun, torpedo tube launchers, rocket launchers and a close-in weapon system". The ship will also contain an integrated communication system and an electronic warfare system.
It has been designed by the Indian Navy’s Directorate of Naval Design as part of Project 28. It is capable of fighting under nuclear, biological and chemical environments. It will be a frontline warship of the Indian Navy with advanced stealth features and a low radar signature that enhances its anti-submarine warfare capability. The ship will have a complement of 17 officers and 106 sailors.

Commissioning 
 has completed sea trials and delivered to Indian Navy on 18 February 2020. The ship was commissioned into the Navy by Indian Army COAS General Manoj Mukund Naravane on 22 October 2020.

References 

Kamorta-class corvettes
Ships built in India
2015 ships
Corvettes of the Indian Navy